John Quincy Adams Brackett (June 8, 1842 – April 6, 1918) was an American lawyer and politician from Massachusetts. A Republican and temperance advocate, he served one term as the 36th Governor of Massachusetts, from 1890 to 1891. Born in New Hampshire and educated at Harvard, he practiced law in Boston before entering politics.

In the Massachusetts House of Representatives, Brackett rose to become Speaker in 1885, and was elected Lieutenant Governor of Massachusetts under Governor Oliver Ames. He succeeded Ames, but his bid for reelection in 1891 was ended by strict enforcement of restrictive liquor laws, and by the negative economic effects on the state of the McKinley Tariff. He was a delegate to the Massachusetts Constitutional Convention of 1917–1918, but died before it ended.

Early years 
John Quincy Adams Brackett was born on June 8, 1842, in Bradford, New Hampshire to Ambrose S. Brackett, a shoemaker and farmer, and Nancy (Brown) Brackett. He attended Colby Academy in nearby New London before entering Harvard College. He received a bachelor's from Harvard in 1865, where he was class orator, and graduated from Harvard Law School in 1868. He then opened a law practice in Boston, first as a sole practitioner, and then in partnership with Levi C. Wade.  He held the post of Judge Advocate of the Massachusetts Militia's First Brigade from 1874 to 1876.  He married Angie Moore Peck of Arlington, Massachusetts on June 20, 1878; they had four children.

Early political career 
Brackett was one of a number of progressive young Republicans who infused the party with new life in the 1880s, sometimes taking on and defeating older party members.  His entry into politics began on the Boston Common Council, on which he served 1873–1877. He next served in the Massachusetts House of Representatives from 1877 to 1882 representing Boston from the 17th Suffolk District  and again from 1884 to 1887.  He served on numerous committees, including as chair of the judiciary and rules committees.  From 1885 to 1887 Brackett was Speaker of the House.  One of his major accomplishments as a legislator was the establishment of cooperative banks, which were designed to encourage thrift among the working class.  As Speaker, he had to manage a highly contentious debate, including an attempted filibuster, of a bill creating a metropolitan Boston police force.

Lieutenant Governor and Governor
From 1887 to 1890 he served as the 34th Lieutenant Governor of Massachusetts under Governor Oliver Ames. For significant portions of 1888 and 1889 Brackett served as acting governor due to Ames's illness, notably representing the state in that capacity at the celebration of the centennial of Ohio's settlement, and at the dedication of the Pilgrim Monument at Plymouth.  In 1889, when Ames retired, Brackett ran to succeed him.  He was supported within the party by a coalition of Blaine supporters (opposed by Mugwumps) and the liquor lobby.  He won the party nomination by bypassing its main power brokers, Senators Ebenezer Rockwood Hoar and Henry L. Dawes, engaging instead in local ward level politicking. His victory in the general election, with just 48% of the popular vote, was one of the worst showings of any Republican governor in the state to date.

During his year in office, Brackett continued his advocacy of cooperative banks, securing legislation exempting their stock from state taxes.  He also effectively advanced an agenda of tax reform and advocated improvements in Massachusetts prisons.

In an action that would later prove controversial, Brackett signed legislation granting an exclusive charter for an elevated streetcar railway to the West End Street Railway, a predecessor to today's MBTA, Boston's public transit system. Henry Whitney, the West End's president, was criticized for the tactics he used to gain legislative approval for the charter, which included bribery of legislators, the retention of a large number of paid lobbyists (including former Governor William Gaston), and payment for favorable press in local newspapers.  The West End also did not immediately begin active use the charter, in part because of questions of high liability in the city's crowded business district, and over the suitability of extant elevated rail technology in Boston's geography. This failure to act brought further charges that the charter had been acquired to squelch competition.

Brackett's term in office marked a low point in the state Republican party, and he was described by historian Richard Harmond as "pliable and mediocre".  The party was internally divided between the Mugwumps and Blaine supporters, as well as between its younger and older leaders.  The state's liquor control laws were a major subject that also caused the party some difficulty. Much of the party leadership was generally in favor of such laws, but opposed outright prohibition. For political purposes, the party had in 1886 formally declared support for a state constitutional amendment banning alcohol, but this had failed to draw significant support from the temperance community.  A popular referendum for the enshrinement of prohibition in the Massachusetts State Constitution failed in 1889, upsetting advocates of prohibition, and Brackett took up their cause in a different way. Although he had opposed the amendment, he ordered stepped-up enforcement of the existing laws, which closed bars that did not serve food.  There was a popular backlash, and Republican appeals to anti-Catholic nativist sentiment also drove many French-Canadian Catholic supporters into the Democratic fold.  These combined with the negative effects of the McKinley Tariff on the Massachusetts economy to cost Brackett reelection.  He was defeated in the 1890 election by Democrat William E. Russell in one of the most successful elections for Democrats in the state since the American Civil War.

Later years
Brackett then returned to his Boston law practice, but remained active in his party.  He refused to run for governor in 1891 against the popular Russell, in 1892 he was a delegate to the Republican National Convention, and he served as a presidential elector in 1896 and 1900. In 1917 he took an active role in the Massachusetts Constitutional Convention of 1917–1918.

In 1887 Brackett built a Queen Anne style home at 87 Pleasant Street, Arlington, Massachusetts where he lived until his death in 1918. It is listed in the National Register of Historic Places as part of the Arlington Center Historic District, and is also part of the local Pleasant Street Historic District.  The Brackett Elementary School at 66 Eastern Avenue in Arlington, first built in 1931, was named after him.

See also
 1877 Massachusetts legislature
 1878 Massachusetts legislature
 1885 Massachusetts legislature
 1886 Massachusetts legislature

References

Bibliography 

 

Republican Party governors of Massachusetts
Lieutenant Governors of Massachusetts
1842 births
1918 deaths
American Unitarians
Harvard Law School alumni
Politicians from Boston
Republican Party members of the Massachusetts House of Representatives
Members of the 1917 Massachusetts Constitutional Convention
Speakers of the Massachusetts House of Representatives
People from Arlington, Massachusetts
Burials at Mount Auburn Cemetery
Colby–Sawyer College alumni
19th-century American politicians
People from Bradford, New Hampshire
Harvard College alumni